Henry Addison Nelson (October 31, 1820, Amherst, Massachusetts – December 31, 1906, St. Louis) was a Presbyterian clergyman. "He was educated at Hamilton College, Clinton, N. Y. (A.B., 1840), after which he taught at Eaton, N. Y., and Homer, N. Y., until 1843, when he entered Auburn Theological Seminary, from which he was graduated in 1846."  He then held the pulpit at the First Presbyterian Church, Auburn, N. Y. (1846–56) and at the First Presbyterian Church, St. Louis (1856–68). He was "professor of systematic and pastoral theology at Lane Theological Seminary, Cincinnati (1868-74), pastor of the First Presbyterian Church at Geneva, N. Y. (1874-1885), and acting pastor at Independence, Mo. (1885-86)." He was also for many years editor of the Church magazine, The Church at Home and Abroad. The Henry A. Nelson Memorial Boys' School, in Tripoli, Lebanon, was named after him.

References

Sources
 
 

 

1820 births
1906 deaths
Hamilton College (New York) alumni
Presbyterian religious workers